Gallacea is a genus of fungi in the Gallaceaceae family. The genus contains six species found in Australia and New Zealand. Gallacea was circumscribed by American mycologist Curtis Gates Lloyd in 1905.

References

External links

Hysterangiales
Agaricomycetes genera